Victoria Paige Meyerink is a producer and former child actress. At the age of four, Meyerink became Danny Kaye's co-star on the CBS variety series The Danny Kaye Show and, in 2006, was honored by the Young Artist Foundation with its Former Child Star "Lifetime Achievement" Award for her role on the series.

Biography

The daughter of actress Jeanne Baird, Meyerink became a model when she was two and a half years old. Although she received a season-long contract to perform on The Danny Kaye Show, she left the program after the laughter of the audience began to upset her.

She went on to co-star with Anne Francis in Brainstorm, with Clint Walker in The Night of the Grizzly and with Elvis Presley in Speedway. On television she guest-starred on such notable shows as Green Acres, My Three Sons and Family Affair.

As an adult, she was, at one time, the youngest female producer in the film industry; producing the film Young Warriors at the age of twenty-two. In addition to Young Warriors, Meyerink produced Nightforce and Finding Home, for which she received the Montreal World Film Festival Excellence in Producing Award.

Filmography

References

Enternal links

Official "Finding Home" site
Victoria Paige Meyerink on TV.com
Victoria Paige Meyerink Interview with Joe Krein at Elvis2001.net

Living people
Film producers from California
American film actresses
American child actresses
Actresses from Santa Barbara, California
American women film producers
20th-century American actresses
21st-century American women
Year of birth missing (living people)